Motarilavoa Hilda Lin̄i is a chief of the Turaga nation of Pentecost Island in Vanuatu in the South Pacific, who has been associated with the nuclear-free Pacific movement, women's rights, indigenous rights, and environmental issues. Following Vanuatu's 1980 independence, she became one of the first two women elected to Parliament, in 1987. During the early 1990s, as Minister of Health, she helped to persuade the World Health Organization to bring the question of the legality of nuclear weapons to the International Court of Justice in The Hague. She received The Nuclear-Free Future Award in 2005. She is sister to Vanuatu's first Prime Minister, Walter Lin̄i.

See also
List of the first women holders of political offices in Oceania

References

Living people
Vanuatuan chiefs
Vanuatuan anti–nuclear weapons activists
Vanuatuan women's rights activists
People from Penama Province
Year of birth missing (living people)
Female foreign ministers
Members of the Parliament of Vanuatu
Vanuatuan women in politics